Carlencas-et-Levas is a commune in the Hérault department in southern France.

Monument

Population

See also
Communes of the Hérault department

References

Communes of Hérault